Rubén Darío Tejada (born October 27, 1989) is a Panamanian professional baseball infielder for the Long Island Ducks of the Atlantic League of Professional Baseball. He has previously played in Major League Baseball (MLB) for the New York Mets, St. Louis Cardinals, San Francisco Giants, and Baltimore Orioles.

Early life
Tejada was born in Santiago de Veraguas in western Panama to Rubén Sr., a mechanic, and Donaji Tejada, a secretary. Tejada also has a younger brother, Ernie. Tejada grew up mere feet away from Omar Torrijos Herrera Stadium where his father was also a pitcher for Los Indios de Veraguas.

Growing up, Tejada's favorite baseball players were shortstops Derek Jeter and Omar Vizquel. In 2001, Tejada played for the Santiago de Veraguas Little League team which represented the Latin American region at the Little League World Series. In 2003, at 13 years old, Tejada began playing for Los Indios de Veraguas’ junior team as a pitcher.

Professional career

Minor leagues
Tejada signed with the Mets as an international free agent in 2006. He debuted in professional baseball in 2007. He has played for the Gulf Coast Mets, Venezuela Mets, St. Lucie Mets and Binghamton Mets. He also played for the Surprise Rafters of the Arizona Fall League.

New York Mets

2010
Tejada was invited to spring training with the Mets in 2010. He was the youngest position player on the Mets Opening Day roster since Tim Foli in 1971. 

On April 7, 2010 he made his major league debut and went 0-for-2 with a HBP in 3 plate appearances.  On April 9, 2010 he recorded his first major league hit off the Washington Nationals' Tyler Walker. On June 4, 2010 the Mets re-called Tejada to replace Luis Castillo. With the activation of Luis Castillo from the DL on July 19, 2010, the Mets optioned Tejada to the Triple-A Buffalo Bisons. He was re-called on August 7, after Alex Cora was released and Jesús Feliciano was demoted to Triple A Buffalo Bisons. On September 5, 2010 in the seventh inning Tejada hit his first major league home run off Cubs pitcher Marcos Mateo on the first pitch. 

For the season, he batted .213/.305/.282.

2011
On May 17, 2011 Tejada was called up to play second base, thus moving Justin Turner to third base for the injured David Wright.  He ended the season with a .284 batting average in 328 at-bats.

2012
Once Jose Reyes signed with the Miami Marlins, Rubén Tejada became the New York Mets starting shortstop for the 2012 season. On August 1, 2012, Tejada hit his second home run in the majors against Matt Cain of the Giants, his first home run since September 5, 2010.

2013
Tejada was placed on the 15-day disabled list with a strained right quad and called up shortstop Omar Quintanilla from the Mets triple-A affiliate Las Vegas 51s to take his spot on the roster. After Quintanilla's unexpected performance however, the Mets optioned Tejada to Las Vegas. For the season, he batted .202/.259/.260.

2015
On October 10, 2015, during the second game of the 2015 National League Division Series, Chase Utley slid into and took out Tejada in an attempt to break up what might have been an inning-ending double play, fracturing Tejada's right fibula in the collision. Utley was ruled safe by the umpires after a video review despite never actually touching the base. The Dodgers, who were losing 2-1 at the time of the incident, rallied to win the game 5-2. Major League Baseball suspended Utley for two games for his conduct "in violation of Official Baseball Rule 5.09 (a) (13), which is designed to protect fielders from precisely this type of rolling block that occurs away from the base." Utley appealed the suspension and remained active for the rest of the Dodgers post-season games. MLB subsequently dropped Utley's suspension on March 6, 2016, with Chief Baseball Officer Joe Torre stating "There wasn't anything clear-cut to say that play violated a rule."

2016
On March 15, 2016, the Mets placed Tejada on waivers, and released him the next day after clearing waivers.

St. Louis Cardinals
On March 19, 2016, Tejada signed a one-year contract worth $1.5 million with the St. Louis Cardinals. Expected to fill in for the injured Jhonny Peralta at shortstop, Tejada himself injured his quad in the final pre-season game, landing on the disabled list to begin the season. Tejada was activated on April 18, but the opening at shortstop was no longer there, having been filled instead by Aledmys Díaz.  Tejada made his first major league appearance as a pitcher on May 20 in the ninth inning at Busch Stadium against the Arizona Diamondbacks, pitching one complete inning while allowing two earned runs, on back-to-back home runs to Chris Herrmann and Brandon Drury. The Cardinals designated Tejada for assignment on May 28. He had six hits in 34 at bats. Tejada declined the outright assignment, becoming a free agent.

San Francisco Giants
On June 13, Tejada signed a minor league contract with the San Francisco Giants. On June 29, Tejada was called up and started at third base after Matt Duffy was put on the 15-day disabled list. On July 20, he was designated for assignment by San Francisco. For the season, he batted .156/.270/.250 with the Giants in 32 at bats.

New York Yankees
On December 12, 2016, Tejada signed a minor league contract with the New York Yankees. On March 27, 2017, Tejada was reassigned to Minor League camp.

Baltimore Orioles
The Baltimore Orioles acquired Tejada from the New York Yankees for cash considerations on June 4, 2017. He was assigned to the Triple-A Norfolk Tides. His contract was selected by the Orioles two days later on June 6. Tejada made his Orioles debut the next night against the Pittsburgh Pirates replacing an injured Manny Machado. For the season he batted .230/.293/.283 with the Orioles.

On November 28, 2017, Tejada signed a minor league contract with the Orioles. He elected free agency on November 3, 2018.

Return to Mets
On March 23, 2019, Tejada signed a minor league contract to return to the Mets and was assigned to Triple-A Syracuse. He hit for the cycle on June 19, 2019 against the Charlotte Knights. On August 14, the Mets selected Tejada's contract. On August 22, Tejada was designated for assignment. He re-signed on a minor league deal on September 1. He became a free agent following the 2019 season.

Toronto Blue Jays
On January 17, 2020, Tejada signed a minor league deal with the Toronto Blue Jays. Tejada was released by the Blue Jays organization on August 31, 2020.

Philadelphia Phillies

On May 5, 2021, Tejada signed a minor league contract with the Philadelphia Phillies. Tejada played in 72 games for the Triple-A Lehigh Valley IronPigs, hitting .231 with 0 home runs and 15 RBI's. On August 25, 2021, Tejada was released by the Phillies.

Chicago White Sox
On September 3, 2021, Tejada signed a minor league deal with the Chicago White Sox. He was assigned to the Triple-A Charlotte Knights. He appeared in 8 games for Charlotte down the stretch, hitting .250/.300/.357 with 1 home run and 5 RBI. He elected free agency on November 7, 2021.

Long Island Ducks
On February 9, 2023, Tejada signed with the Long Island Ducks of the Atlantic League of Professional Baseball.

International career
Tejada played for Panama's national baseball team during the 2009 World Baseball Classic and the 2013 World Baseball Classic qualifying tournament.

In 2022, Tejada was selected to represent Panama in the qualifiers for the 2023 World Baseball Classic; Panama qualified for the tournament for the first time in its history. In the tournament itself, Tejada slashed .333/.375/.667 with five hits in 15 at-bats; was one of the most productive hitters on the Panama squad, with a team-leading OPS of 1.042. However, Pool A ended in a five-way tie, with all five teams finishing with 2-2 records, and Panama was eliminated by tiebreaker.

See also

 List of Major League Baseball players from Panama

References

External links

1989 births
Living people
Baltimore Orioles players
Binghamton Mets players
Binghamton Rumble Ponies players	
Buffalo Bisons (minor league) players
Gulf Coast Mets players
Honolulu Sharks players
Las Vegas 51s players
Major League Baseball players from Panama
Major League Baseball shortstops
New York Mets players
Norfolk Tides players
Panamanian expatriate baseball players in the United States
People from Santiago District, Veraguas
Sacramento River Cats players
San Francisco Giants players
Scranton/Wilkes-Barre RailRiders players
Springfield Cardinals players
St. Louis Cardinals players
St. Lucie Mets players
Surprise Rafters players
Syracuse Mets players
Venezuelan Summer League Mets players
2009 World Baseball Classic players
2023 World Baseball Classic players
Panamanian expatriate baseball players in Venezuela
Lehigh Valley IronPigs players
Charlotte Knights players
Gigantes del Cibao players
Panamanian expatriate baseball players in the Dominican Republic